In mathematics, the Kardar–Parisi–Zhang (KPZ) equation is a non-linear stochastic partial differential equation, introduced by Mehran Kardar, Giorgio Parisi, and Yi-Cheng Zhang in 1986. It describes the temporal change of a height field  with spatial coordinate  and time coordinate :

 

Here  is white Gaussian noise with average 

 

and second moment

In one spatial dimension the KPZ equation corresponds to a stochastic version of the Burgers' equation with field  via the substitution .

Via the renormalization group, the KPZ equation is conjectured to be the field theory of many surface growth models, such as the Eden model, ballistic deposition, and the SOS model. A rigorous proof has been given by Bertini and Giacomin in the case of the SOS model.

KPZ universality class 
Many interacting particle systems, such as the totally asymmetric simple exclusion process, lie in the KPZ universality class. This class is characterized by the following critical exponents in one spatial dimension (1 + 1 dimension): the roughness exponent α = 1/2, growth exponent β = 1/3, and dynamic exponent z = 3/2. In order to check if a growth model is within the KPZ class, one can calculate the width of the surface:

 

where  is the mean surface height at time t and L is the size of the system. For models within the KPZ class, the main properties of the surface  can be characterized by the Family–Vicsek scaling relation of the roughness 

 

with a scaling function  satisfying

 

In 2014, Hairer and Quastel have shown that more generally the following KPZ-like equations lie within the KPZ universality class:

Here  is any even-degree polynomial.

Solving the KPZ equation 
Due to the nonlinearity in the equation and the presence of space-time white-noise, the solutions to the KPZ equation are known not to be smooth or regular but rather 'fractal' or 'rough.' Indeed, even without the nonlinear term, the equation reduces to the stochastic heat equation, whose solution is not differentiable in the space variable but verifies a Hölder condition with exponent < 1/2. Thus, the nonlinear term  is ill-defined in a classical sense. 

In 2013, Martin Hairer made a breakthrough in solving the KPZ equation by constructing approximations using Feynman diagrams. In 2014 he was awarded the Fields Medal for this work, along with rough paths theory and regularity structures.

Physical derivation 

Suppose we want to describe a surface growth by some partial differential equation. Let  represent the height of the surface at position x and at time t. Their values are continuous. We expect that there would be a sort of smoothening mechanism. Then the simplest equation for the surface growth may be taken to be the diffusion equation  

But this is a deterministic equation (heat equation) and the surface has no fluctuations. The simplest way to include fluctuations is to add a noise term. Then we may employ the equation

with  taken to be the Gaussian white noise with mean zero and covariance . This is known as the Edwards–Wilkinson (EW) equation or stochastic heat equation with additive noise (SHE). Since this is a linear equation, it can be solved exactly by using Fourier analysis. But since the noise is Gaussian and the equation is linear, the fluctuations seen for this equation are still Gaussian. The EW equation is not enough to describe the surface growth of interest. So we need to add a nonlinear function for the growth. Therefore surface growth change in time has three contributions. The first models lateral growth as a nonlinear function of the form . The second is a relaxation, or regularization, through the diffusion term , and the third is the white noise forcing  . Therefore,

The key term , the deterministic part of the growth, is assumed to be a function only of the slope, and to be a symmetric function. A great observation of Kardar, Parisi, Zhang (KPZ)  was that, while a surface grows in a normal (to the surface) direction, we are measuring the height on the height axis, which is perpendicular to the space x axis, and hence there should appear a nonlinearity coming from this simple geometric effect.  When the surface slope  is small, the effect takes the form  however this leads to a seemingly intractable equation. In fact what is done is to take a general F and expand it

The first term can be removed from the equation by a time shift: If  solves the KPZ equation, then  solves 

The second should vanish because of the symmetry, but could anyway have been removed from the equation by a constant velocity shift of coordinates: If  solves the KPZ equation, then  solves 

Thus the quadratic term is the first nontrivial contribution, and it is the only one kept. We arrive at the KPZ equation

See also 

 Fokker–Planck equation
 Stochastic partial differential equation
 Universality (dynamical systems)
 rough path
 fractal
 Renormalization group
 surface growth
quantum field theory
Tracy–Widom distribution

Sources

Notes 

 
 
 
 

Statistical mechanics
Stochastic differential equations
Partial differential equations